kodak is a poetry collection by Patti Smith, published in 1972.

Contents 
 Untitled
 "k.o.d.a.k."
 "Star Fever"
 Untitled ("Renee Falconetti")
 Untitled ("Georgia O'Keeffe")
 "Radando Beach"
 "Conch"
 Untitled ("Prayer")
 "Balance"

Notes

External links 
 

American poetry collections
Poetry by Patti Smith
1972 poetry books
Books by Patti Smith